The passion fruit (Passiflora edulis) is a vine species of passion flower that is native to South America.

Passion fruit or Passionfruit may also refer to:
Passion fruit (fruit), the fruit of a number of plants in the Passiflora family

Film and TV
Passion Fruit (film), a lost 1921 silent film
Fruits of Passion, a 1981 French-Japanese co-production

Music
Passion Fruit (group), a German Eurodance/bubblegum dance group

Albums
Passion Fruits, 1994 composition and album by Danish composer Sven Erik Werner
Passionfruit (album), a 1983 jazz vocal album by Michael Franks

Songs
"Passionfruit" (song), a 2017 song by Canadian hip-hop artist Drake 
"Passion Fruit" (song), a 2007 song by the Japanese group Fujifabric
"Passion Fruit", a song from the 1977 Lou Donaldson album Color as a Way of Life  
"Passion Fruit", a song from the 1990 The Rippingtons Welcome to the St. James' Club 
"Passion Fruit", a 1984 song by the Shillelagh Sisters
"Passion Fruit", B-side of "Take Me In" by Bonnie Pink
"Passion Fruit", a song by Danny! from the 2006 album Dream, Interrupted

Other uses
Passion Fruit (character), a character in The Annoying Orange series
Passion fruit woodiness virus, a plant pathogenic virus
Passionfruit Theatre, a theatre and theatre company based in Athlone, County Westmeath, Ireland
Passionfruit, poetry collective Mark Beech, Jen Saunders and others